The 1960-61 Los Angeles Lakers season was the franchise's 13th season in the NBA and first season in Los Angeles, following their off-season relocation from the Twin Cities of Minnesota. The Lakers finished in second place in the NBA Western Division during the 1960–61 NBA season, with a record of 36–43, 15 games behind the St. Louis Hawks.  The Lakers qualified for the Western Division playoffs, defeating the Detroit Pistons, three games to two in the semifinals, before losing again to the Hawks in the West Finals, four games to three.

Roster

Regular season

Season standings

x – clinched playoff spot

Record vs. opponents

Game log

Playoffs

|- align="center" bgcolor="#ccffcc"
| 1
| March 14
| Detroit
| W 120–102
| Elgin Baylor (40)
| Ray Felix (21)
| Los Angeles Memorial Sports Arena
| 1–0
|- align="center" bgcolor="#ccffcc"
| 2
| March 15
| Detroit
| W 127–118
| Elgin Baylor (49)
| Elgin Baylor (21)
| Los Angeles Memorial Sports Arena4,253
| 2–0
|- align="center" bgcolor="#ffcccc"
| 3
| March 17
| @ Detroit
| L 113–124
| Elgin Baylor (26)
| —
| Detroit Olympia3,422
| 2–1
|- align="center" bgcolor="#ffcccc"
| 4
| March 18
| @ Detroit
| L 114–123
| Elgin Baylor (47)
| —
| Detroit Olympia
| 2–2
|- align="center" bgcolor="#ccffcc"
| 5
| March 19
| Detroit
| W 137–120
| Elgin Baylor (35)
| Baylor, Felix (15)
| Los Angeles Memorial Sports Arena3,705
| 3–2
|-

|- align="center" bgcolor="#ccffcc"
| 1
| March 21
| @ St. Louis
| W 122–118
| Elgin Baylor (44)
| Elgin Baylor (14)
| Kiel Auditorium8,147
| 1–0
|- align="center" bgcolor="#ffcccc"
| 2
| March 22
| @ St. Louis
| L 106–121
| Elgin Baylor (35)
| Elgin Baylor (9)
| Kiel Auditorium8,472
| 1–1
|- align="center" bgcolor="#ccffcc"
| 3
| March 24
| St. Louis
| W 118–112
| Elgin Baylor (25)
| Elgin Baylor (18)
| Los Angeles Memorial Sports Arena5,006
| 2–1
|- align="center" bgcolor="#ffcccc"
| 4
| March 25
| St. Louis
| L 117–118
| Jerry West (33)
| Elgin Baylor (15)
| Los Angeles Memorial Sports Arena4,923
| 2–2
|- align="center" bgcolor="#ccffcc"
| 5
| March 27
| @ St. Louis
| W 121–112
| Elgin Baylor (47)
| Elgin Baylor (20)
| Kiel Auditorium
| 3–2
|- align="center" bgcolor="#ffcccc"
| 6
| March 29
| St. Louis
| L 113–114 (OT)
| Elgin Baylor (39)
| Elgin Baylor (21)
| Los Angeles Memorial Sports Arena14,840
| 3–3
|- align="center" bgcolor="#ffcccc"
| 7
| April 1
| @ St. Louis
| L 103–105
| Elgin Baylor (39)
| Baylor, West (12)
| Kiel Auditorium–
| 3–4
|-

Awards and records
 Elgin Baylor, All-NBA First Team
 Elgin Baylor, NBA All-Star Game
 Jerry West, NBA All-Star Game
 Rod Hundley, NBA All-Star Game

References

Los Angeles Lakers seasons
Los Angeles
Los Angle
Los Angle